Stanley Goletz (May 21, 1918 – June 7, 1997) was a pinch hitter in Major League Baseball. Nicknamed "Stash", he played for the Chicago White Sox in 1941.

References

External links

1918 births
1997 deaths
Chicago White Sox players
Baseball players from Ohio
People from Belmont County, Ohio